François Fernandez (born 22 February 1960) is a French classical violinist who specializes in historically informed performance.

Career 
Born in Rouen in a family of musicians, Fernandez began learning the classical violin at the age of twelve, then the baroque violin, two years later, and finally devoted himself solely to the baroque instrument, undertaking a parallel study with Sigiswald Kuijken. At the age of seventeen, he played with the Kuijken brothers' La Petite Bande and, in 1978, obtained his soloist's diploma.

For several years, he has devoted himself to chamber music with the Kuijken brothers, the Ricercar Consort and the Hantai brothers.

Besides the baroque violin, Fernandez plays the viola, the viola d'amore, the viol and the cello da spalla. He has taught at the conservatories of Toulouse, Liège, Brussels and Trossingen. Since 1998, he has been teaching the baroque violin at the Conservatoire de Paris. He regularly gives masterclasses in Belgium and Spain.

In collaboration with other musicians, Philippe Pierlot and Rainer Zipperling (1955-), he founded the record label "Flora" in 1991.

See also 
 Sigiswald Kuijken
 Wieland Kuijken

References

External links 
 Discography (Discogs)
 Bach, prelude partita n.3 in E Major BWV 1006, François Fernandez/baroque violin (YouTube)

1960 births
Musicians from Rouen
Living people
Academic staff of the Conservatoire de Paris
Academic staff of the Royal Conservatory of Brussels
French performers of early music
20th-century French male classical violinists
21st-century French male classical violinists